The Weightlifting events at the 2013 Islamic Solidarity Games were held at the Swarna Dwipa Hotel in Palembang from 24 to 27 September 2013.

Medalists

Men

Women

Medal table

References

Results day 1-3 
Results day 4 

Islamic Solidarity Games
2013 Islamic Solidarity Games
2013
Weightlifting in Indonesia